Gifhorn is a town and capital of the district of Gifhorn in the east of Lower Saxony, Germany. It has a population of about 42,000 and is mainly influenced by the small distance to the more industrial and commercially important cities nearby, Brunswick and Wolfsburg. Further, Gifhorn is part of the Hanover-Brunswick-Göttingen-Wolfsburg Metropolitan Region. The Municipality Gifhorn includes the villages of Gamsen, Gifhorn, Kästorf, Neubokel, Wilsche and Winkel.

The oldest verifiable source attests the existence of the city in the year 1196.

Gifhorn is home to the International Wind- and Watermill Museum, which contains a comprehensive collection and working replicas of the world's most common windmills.

Geography
Gifhorn lies at the confluence of the Rivers Ise and Aller. In the city, the Bundesstraße 4 and 188 meet. At the northern end of the city, the Lüneburg Heath starts.

History

Gifhorn was first mentioned in 1196. It was located at the crossing of two then important merchant routes: the salt street being a main trading route for salt between Lüneburg and Brunswick, and the grain street transporting grain between Celle and Magdeburg.

Education
Schools in Gifhorn include the Humboldt Gymnasium, the Otto-Hahn-Gymnasium, Fritz-Reuter-Realschule, Dietrich-Bonhoeffer-Realschule, Albert-Schweitzer-Hauptschule and the Berufsbildenden Schulen I and II. Alfred-Teves-Schule, which was called Volksschule Süd between 1954 and 1958, was open between 1954 and 2010.

Transport

The Gifhorn rail station is in the southern part of the town.

In the city, the Bundesstraße 4 and 188 meet.

The Bells Palace
Glocken-Palast, or The Bells Palace, is a monument and large building in Gifhorn. It was completed after 16 years of construction, combining various Russian timber building styles. Its cornerstone was laid by former Russian president Mikhail Gorbachev in 1996.

It was built as a centre to promote cultural exchange across Europe, following the fall of the Iron Curtain.

The Bells Palace will host events and exhibitions celebrating peace, freedom and cultural diversity.

Twin towns – sister cities

Gifhorn is twinned with:

 Dumfries, Scotland
 Gardelegen, Germany
 Hallsberg, Sweden
 Korsun-Shevchenkivskyi, Ukraine
 Xanthi, Greece

Notable people
 Heinrich Decimator (c. 1544 – c. 1615), clergyman, author of a universal dictionary (1st edition 1580: German, Latin and Greek, later Hebrew and French added)
 Thorsten Heins (born 1957), manager
 Anna Montanaro (born 1973), musical actress and actress
 Kay-Sölve Richter (born 1974), journalist and newsreader (ZDF)
 Katharina Marie Schubert (born 1977), theater and film actress
 Fabian Klos (born 1987), footballer
 Senta-Sofia Delliponti (born 1990), actress and singer
 Bjarne Thoelke (born 1992), footballer
 Luis Michael Dörrbecker (born 1993), Mexican racing driver

References

External links
 
  
 International museum of mills